The fifth and final season of the action-adventure television series The A-Team premiered in the United States on NBC on September 26, 1986, and concluded on March 8, 1987, consisting of 13 episodes. Robert Vaughn and Eddie Velez joined the cast in this season. At the beginning of this season, a remixed version of The A-Team theme song was introduced.

Opening credits
The opening credits were changed in this season, which consisted of scenes taken from "Dishpan Man", "Trial by Fire", "Firing Line", Season 3's "Timber", Season 4's feature length two part episode "Judgment Day", "The Sound of Thunder", and Season 5's "Quarterback Sneak".

Cast
 George Peppard as Lieutenant Colonel/Colonel John "Hannibal" Smith
 Dirk Benedict as First Lieutenant Templeton "Faceman" Peck
 Dwight Schultz as Captain H. M. Murdock
 Mr. T as Sergeant First Class Bosco Albert "B. A." (Bad Attitude) Baracus
 Eddie Velez as Frankie "Dishpan Man" Santana
 Robert Vaughn as (former United States Army General) Hunt Stockwell

Premise
After the last four seasons, ratings had started going down for the show since it had been "wash and repeat" for several years, with repeating problems that clients presented them with. A change was made in an effort to bring ratings back up by completely changing the A-Team's reason for being on missions, as well as introducing a new member (Frankie Santana) to the team. The running gag of Face constantly springing Murdock from the mental hospital was also dropped, with Murdock declared sane and usually out looking for a job; Murdock has never held the same job for two episodes, suggesting his lunacy or being dragged on missions caused his bosses to fire him.

The A-Team now resided in a safe house in Virginia, although Murdock continued to live separately in an apartment. Now under the command of the mysterious General Stockwell, the team was now working for the government on top secret missions that the U.S. could not send their own agents in on; after a set amount, Stockwell would get them presidential pardons. New running gags involved Frankie and Face questioning Stockwell's methods, Frankie arguing with B.A. over transportation between countries (as Frankie gets seasick, while B.A. is just scared of flying), and Hannibal going against Stockwell's orders.

Episodes

References

The A-Team seasons
1986 American television seasons
1987 American television seasons